Mary Louise Comingore (August 24, 1913 – December 30, 1971), known professionally as Dorothy Comingore, was an American film actress. She  starred as Susan Alexander Kane in Citizen Kane (1941), the critically acclaimed debut film of Orson Welles. In earlier films she was credited as Linda Winters, and she had appeared on the stage as Kay Winters. Her career ended when she was caught up in the Hollywood blacklist. She declined to answer questions when she was called before the House Un-American Activities Committee in 1952.

Early years
Margaret Louise Comingore was born in Los Angeles, California and was described as "a one-time Oakland school girl." She attended the University of California, Berkeley. Her father was an electrotyper; her sister Lucille operated a nightclub in San Francisco.

From 1934 to 1940, Comingore was billed in her stage appearances as Kay Winters and then Linda Winters as a film actress.

Film
Dorothy Comingore was discovered by Charles Chaplin when she was acting in a small playhouse in Carmel. Whether Chaplin played any role in her career is questionable. In 1938, Comingore denied being Chaplin's protégé and indicated that press reports had exaggerated the limited contact that she had with Chaplin and one of his assistants.

Comingore played bit parts in Hollywood movies until Orson Welles cast her as Susan Alexander, the second wife of press tycoon Charles Foster Kane, in his debut feature film Citizen Kane (1941). Her performance garnered rave reviews: “(She) is put through a range of emotions that would try any actress one could name,” wrote The Hollywood Reporter.

Comingore's supposed Communist connections played a role in a legal battle for custody of her two children with Richard J. Collins. Although Collins was a member of the Communist Party, he later asked to appear before the House Un-American Activities Committee and revealed the names of communist colleagues. As a result, he was favored in the custody battle.

According to Peter Bogdanovich in his DVD commentary on Citizen Kane, she impaired her subsequent career by turning down too many roles that she felt were uninteresting.  She appeared in the film version of the Eugene O'Neill play The Hairy Ape (1944) with William Bendix, Susan Hayward and John Loder.  Comingore's last movie appearance was in a supporting role in The Big Night (1951) starring John Drew Barrymore. Her career ended in 1951, when she was caught up in the Hollywood blacklist.

The following year she was called to appear before the House Un-American Activities Committee about her alleged Communist connections, and she declined to answer on constitutional grounds. Soon after she was accused of heavy drinking in custody hearings for her children, and on March 19, 1953, she was arrested for prostitution in West Hollywood. The arrest is believed by many to have been part of a revenge scheme orchestrated by the police, offended that she mocked the HUAC. Comingore also said that her 1953 arrest on a prostitution charge was "all a part of my being an 'unfriendly witness.'"

Comingore was one of the contributors to Citizen Kane who was personally interviewed by Dr. Howard Suber of the UCLA School of Theater, Film and Television. His research was used by Pauline Kael for her 1971 essay, "Raising Kane". A copy of the interview is in the collection of the Lilly Library at Indiana University Bloomington.

Personal life
Comingore was married to screenwriter Richard Meltzer. She also married screenwriter Richard J. Collins, with whom she had a daughter, Judith, and a son, Michael. They were divorced in 1946. Her other husbands were screenwriter Theodore Strauss and John W. Crowe, a post office employee, from 1962 until her death in 1971.

Comingore struggled with alcoholism during her later life, to the extent that she lost custody of her two children with Richard J. Collins.

Death
Comingore died December 30, 1971, from a pulmonary disease in Stonington, Connecticut, at the age of 58. She had also broken her back years prior and subsequently restricted her movements, mostly confined to her seaside apartment.

Cultural references
In Guilty by Suspicion, Irwin Winkler's 1991 film set during the Hollywood blacklist, Comingore inspired the character of the actress who is harassed by the House Un-American Activities Committee.

Radio credits

Film and television credits

References

External links

American film actresses
Hollywood blacklist
1913 births
1971 deaths
20th-century American actresses
Actresses from Los Angeles County, California
Respiratory disease deaths in Connecticut